Annoying Orange: Carnage (formerly Annoying Orange: Kitchen Carnage) is a 2011 casual mobile game developed by Bottle Rocket and published by Eastedge Studios. Based on the comedy web series Annoying Orange, it was released for iOS on April 7, 2011. In the game, players throw various produce into blenders across a kitchen, earning points for each successful throw. A total score will be calculated when a time limit has been reached.

Carnage was well received by critics, expressing admiration for its simple, progressive, and addictive gameplay. Criticism and concerns drew from its repetitive use of voice clips and its graphics, including its realistic depiction of violence.

Gameplay
The objective of Carnage is to throw various produce items across a kitchen by flicks from the player, and land them in a series of blenders in a set time limit. A faster flick will result in a farther throw, and its path determines the amount of points earned, as produce bouncing from wall will earn more than a direct route to the blender. Consistently and rapidly throwing produce into a blender without missing will grant bonus points, and successfully throwing them in blenders fills a "juice meter", which if full, proceeds the player to the next level.

As the player progresses each level, several blenders will appear, earning the player a certain amount of points depending on the speed of its movement. Later in the game, new produce of intricate shapes will appear, such as bananas and pineapples, and a range hood will open, earning the player more points. Occasionally, the game tells the player to shake their device, revealing a cutting board. The cupboard contain characters from the Annoying Orange series. When the player lands a produce on it, extra time is granted. Throughout the game, voice clips from the series play and the titular character Orange provides dialogue on-screen. A display of the final score will be shown at the end of the game.

Development and release
Carnage was developed by Thruster Games, a division of Bottle Rocket, and was published by both the developer and Eastedge Studios. The game is based on the comedy web series Annoying Orange, and was released on April 7, 2011 for iOS devices. Dane Boedigheimer, creator of Annoying Orange, summarized the game as having similar contents as the web series, in which he said it "transitions perfectly to a fast paced arcade style game".

Reception

Carnage received "mixed or average reviews" according to review aggregator Metacritic. Phillip Levin of 148Apps rated the game three out of five stars, and found that the gameplay was easy to learn, and recommended it for players who are looking for short-term gameplay. Despite this, Levin called Carange as a game that lacks replayability, while players can "kill time while you wait for something more entertaining to happen".

AppSpy rated Carnage three out of five, and praised the variety of progressive factors in the levels, such as bonus points from tricky throws and new characters with each level. Andrew Nesvadba found the voice clips to be annoying, while noting that the feature can be turned off. Gamezebo rated the game four out of five stars, but disapproved of its constant dialogue and voice clips that play in the game, calling Orange as "constantly berating you in the background". AppSafari compared Carnage gameplay to Skee-ball, but also finds the game's voice clips annoying but its gameplay addictive. Slide to Play gave a review of three out of four, and admired the addictiveness and pacing of the game, as Oxford called it having "a lot of bizarre split-second decisions".

Modojo found that the game's graphics made it hard to determine how to throw, as it is a "2D game that makes you think in 3D", and wished for longer gameplay by allowing more options to extend the timer. Regarding its similarities to the series, Modojo praised Bottle Rocket for providing the same atmosphere as the web series. Common Sense Media reviewer Jonathan Liu gave the game four stars out of five and a rating of ages 13 and up due to the violent and realistic effects of the produce being sliced. He stated that the game was similar to the Paper Toss app, and although found it entertaining, advised that it was not suitable for children because of its brand promotion and emphasis on violence. Tubefilter expressed similar thoughts, also describing the game as Paper Toss-like, and praised its graphics and level of difficulty to keep players engaged.

References

The Annoying Orange video games
2011 video games
Action video games
Android (operating system) games
Casual games
IOS games
Video games about food and drink
Video games developed in the United States